St. Michael's Church in the Old Town neighborhood of Chicago is a Roman Catholic church staffed by the Redemptorist order of priests.  The parish was founded to minister to German (and Luxembourgish) Catholic immigrants in 1852 with its first wooden church completed that year at a cost of $750 (including the bell). The building stands at the intersection of Eugenie Street and Cleveland Avenue. The church was built as a haven for German immigrants who were outcasts in Old Chicago. In addition, the town's main church, St. Joseph's Church, was overcrowded. The Redemptorists were invited to administer the parish in 1860 and a large brick church was finished in 1869. When completed, its tower made it the tallest building in Chicago and the United States, a distinction it held until the old Chicago Board of Trade Building was completed in 1885.

History
The church was one of seven buildings to 'survive' the path of the Great Chicago Fire of 1871, albeit heavily damaged. While most of Old Chicago's infrastructure was made of wood, the church was made of brick which helped it survive the fire. Portions of the building survived—the stone walls of St. Michael's being the only structures standing in the Old Town area.  The church was quickly rebuilt.

In 1871, just after the Great Chicago Fire members of the parish formed the first Luxembourgish-American organization in the United States, the Luxemburger Unterstuetzungs Verien (Luxembourg Mutual Aid Society). 

There is a saying in Chicago that if you can hear the bells of St. Michael's, you are in Old Town.

When Mayor Richard J. Daley's urban renewal program began, it was the Old Town Triangle Organization of the Lincoln Park Conservation Association that took the lead in promoting urban renewal.  St. Michael's like many other neighborhood institutions took advantage of the program to rehab and to expand.

Gallery

See also
 Saint Michael: Roman Catholic traditions and views

References

External links

 http://www.st-mikes.org/

German-American culture in Chicago
Michaels Church, Old Town
Redemptorist churches in the United States
1852 establishments in Illinois
Roman Catholic churches completed in 1869